In cricket, a captain is a player who leads the team and has additional roles and responsibilities. The Indian Premier League (IPL) is a professional league for Twenty20 cricket in India, which has been held annually since its first edition in 2008. In the 14 seasons played, 50 players have captained their team in at least one match.

Mumbai Indian’s Rohit Sharma is the most successful captain in the IPL with 5 title wins.Chennai Super Kings's Mahendra Singh Dhoni has 4 titles and has played the most matches as a captain, with the highest win–loss percentage among successful captains who have captained over 170 matches,ms dhoni is the only captain who has played most no of finals and qualified for most times in the playoffs,he is renowned around the world by the name of captain cool,when it comes to captaincy none comes near to him, Dhoni has played 162 matches and won the most matches playing as a captain with 100, and has also lost the most matches playing as a captain with 64 Dhoni has played 162 matches and won the most matches playing as a captain.where as rohit sharma bags second place with 5 titles Mahela Jayawardene and Kumar Sangakkara are the only players to captain three teams: the former has captained the Delhi Daredevils, the Kings XI Punjab and the Kochi Tuskers Kerala, whereas the latter has captained Kings XI Punjab, Deccan Chargers and Sunrisers Hyderabad.

James Hopes of the Daredevils has captained the most matches without registering a win; he led his team in three matches, two of which were lost and one ended with no result. Six players have captained the Daredevils, the Indians and the Warriors each; five players have captained the Kings XI and the Royal Challengers each; four players have captained the Deccan Chargers; three players have captained the Kolkata Knight Riders and the Rajasthan Royals each; whereas two players have captained the Super Kings and the Tuskers each.

The list includes those players who have captained their team in at least one IPL match. The list is initially organised by the number of matches as a captain and if the numbers are tied, the list is sorted by last name.

Key

Captains

Notes

References

Indian Premier League
Indian Premier
Premier
Indian Premier League lists
IPL ka baap kaun hai